Bivalvulida is an order of myxosporean parasites which contains a number of species which cause economically significant losses to aquaculture and fisheries, such as Myxobolus cerebralis and Ceratomyxa shasta. The Myxosporean stages of members of the bivalvulida are characterised by their two spore valves (hence the name), which meet in a "suture line" which encircles the spore. They usually contain two polar capsules, but species have been reported which contain either one or four.

Taxonomy and systematics
The order Bivalvulida is composed of three suborders and thirteen families.
Suborder Platysporina Kudo, 1919
Myxobolidae Thélohan, 1892
Suborder Sphaeromyxina Lom & Noble, 1984
Sphaeromyxidae Lom & Noble, 1984
Suborder Variisporina Lom & Noble, 1984
Auerbachiidae
Alatasporidae Shulman, Kovaleva & Dubina, 1979
Ceratomyxidae Doflein, 1899
Chloromyxidae Thélohan, 1892
Coccomyxidae Léger & Hesse, 1907
Fabesporidae Naidenova & Zaika, 1969
Myxidiidae Thélohan, 1892
Myxobilatidae Shulman, 1953
Ortholineidae Lom & Noble, 1984
Parvicapsulidae Shulman, 1953
Sinuolineidae Shulman, 1959
Sphaerosporidae Davis, 1917

Gallery
Drawings and scanning electron microscopy of species of Chloromyxum

References

 
Myxosporea
Cnidarian orders